Inês de Castro (in Castilian: Inés; 1325 – 7 January 1355) was a Galician noblewoman and courtier, best known as lover and posthumously-recognized wife of King Peter I of Portugal. The dramatic circumstances of her relationship with Peter (at the time Prince of Portugal), which was forbidden by his father King Afonso IV, her murder at the orders of Afonso, Peter's bloody revenge on her killers, and the legend of the coronation of her exhumed corpse by Peter, have made Inês de Castro a frequent subject of art, music, and drama through the ages.

Biography
Inês was the natural daughter of Pedro Fernández de Castro, Lord of Lemos and Sarria, and his noble Portuguese mistress Aldonça Lourenço de Valadares. Her family descended both from the Galician and Portuguese nobilities. She was also well connected to the Castilian royal family, by illegitimate descent. Her stepmother was Infanta Beatrix of Portugal, the youngest daughter of Afonso of Portugal, Lord of Portalegre and Violante Manuel. Her grandmother was Violante Sánchez of Castile, Lady of Uzero, the illegitimate daughter of Sancho IV of Castile.  Her great-great grandfather was Rodrigo Alfonso de León, Lord of Aliger, the illegitimate son of Alfonso IX of León. She also descended from Infanta Sancha Henriques of Portugal, the daughter of Henry, Count of Portugal.

Inês came to Portugal in 1340 as a lady-in-waiting of Constance of Castile, recently married to Peter, the heir apparent to the Portuguese throne. The prince fell in love with her and started to neglect his lawful wife, endangering the already feeble relations with Castile. Moreover, Peter's love for Inês brought the exiled Castilian nobility very close to power, with Inês's brothers becoming the prince's friends and trusted advisors. King Afonso IV of Portugal, Peter's father, disliked Inês's influence on his son and waited for their mutual infatuation to wear off, but it did not.

Constance of Castile died in 1349. Afonso IV tried several times to arrange for his son to be remarried, but Pedro refused to take a wife other than Inês, who was not deemed eligible to be queen. Peter's legitimate son, future King Ferdinand I of Portugal, was a frail child, whereas Peter and Inês's illegitimate children were thriving; this created even more discomfort among the Portuguese nobles, who feared the increasing Castilian influence over Peter. Afonso IV had banished Inês from the court in 1344, but Peter remained with her, declaring her as his true love. After several attempts to keep the lovers apart, Afonso IV ordered Inês's death. Pêro Coelho, Álvaro Gonçalves, and Diogo Lopes Pacheco went to the Monastery of Santa Clara-a-Velha in Coimbra, where Inês was detained, and killed her, decapitating her in front of her small child. When Peter heard of this he sought out the killers and managed to capture two of them in 1361. He executed them publicly by ripping their hearts out, claiming they didn't have one after having pulverized his own heart.

Peter became king of Portugal in 1357 (Peter I of Portugal). He then stated that he had secretly married Inês, who was consequently the lawful queen, although his word was, and still is, the only proof of the marriage. During the 1383–85 Crisis of royal succession in Portugal, João das Regras produced evidence that allegedly established that Pope Innocent VI had refused Peter's request to recognize his marriage to Inês and legitimize his children by her, the elder of whom, John, Duke of Valencia de Campos would have a strong potential claim to the throne of Portugal. By negating these children's claimed legitimacy, João das Regras strengthened the claim of another illegitimate child of Peter I of Portugal: John, Master of Aviz, who ultimately took the throne and ruled as John I of Portugal.

Some sources say that after Peter became king of Portugal, he had Inês' body exhumed from her grave and forced the entire court to swear allegiance to their new queen: "The king [Peter] caused the body of his beloved Inês to be disinterred, and placed on a throne, adorned with the diadem and royal robes, and required all the nobility of the kingdom to approach and kiss the hem of her garment, rendering her when dead that homage which she had not received in her life..."  Some modern sources characterize the story of Inês' post-mortem coronation as a "legend" and it is most likely a myth, since the story only appeared in 1577 in Jerónimo Bermúdez' play Nise Laureada. She was later buried at the Monastery of Alcobaça where her coffin can still be seen, opposite Peter's so that, according to the legend, at the Last Judgment Peter and Inês can look at each other as they rise from their graves. Both marble coffins are exquisitely sculpted with scenes from their lives and a promise by Peter that they would be together até ao fim do mundo (until the end of the world).

Inês de Castro and Peter I had the following children, who were legitimized by Peter I on 19 March 1361:
Afonso, died shortly after birth.
John, Duke of Valencia de Campos, claimant to the throne during the 1383–85 Crisis.
Denis, Lord of Cifuentes, claimant to the throne during the 1383–1385 Crisis.
Beatrice, married Sancho Alfonso, 1st Count of Alburquerque and was thereby the great-grandmother of Ferdinand II of Aragon. And thereby an ancestor of all spanish monarchs.

Inês de Castro in literature and music

Inês de Castro's story is immortalized in several plays and poems in Portuguese, such as The Lusíadas by Luís de Camões (canto iii, stanzas 118-135), and Spanish, such as Nise lastimosa and Nise laureada (1577) by Jerónimo Bermúdez, Reinar despues de morir by Luís Vélez de Guevara, as well as by the comtesse de Genlis (Inès de Castro, 1826), and in a play by French playwright Henry de Montherlant called La Reine morte (The Dead Queen). Inês de Castro is a novel by Maria Pilar Queralt del Hierro (es) in Spanish and Portuguese. 

Works written in English include Aphra Behn's novel Agnes de Castro, or, the Force of Generous Love (1688); and Catharine Trotter Cockburn's play Agnes de Castro (1695). Mary Russell Mitford also wrote a drama from the story entitled Inez de Castro. The Undiscovered Island, a novel in English by Darrell Kastin, features a descendant's version of the events in the tragedy of Inês de Castro and Dom Pedro. It was published in 2009 by Tagus Press, University of Mass, Dartmouth. 

Felicia Hemans' poem The Coronation of Inez de Castro first appeared in The New Monthly Magazine in 1828.

She is a recurring figure in Ezra Pound's The Cantos. She appears first at the end of Canto III, in the lines Ignez da Castro murdered, and a wall/Here stripped, here made to stand.

There have been over 20 operas and ballets created about Inês de Castro.  Operas from the 18th and 19th centuries include:
Ines di Castro by Bernhard Anselm Weber (1790, Hanover) 
Ines di Castro by Niccolò Antonio Zingarelli (1798) 
Ines de Castro by Walter Savage Landor (1831)
Ines de Castro by Giuseppe Persiani to a libretto by Salvadore Cammarano (1835) 
Ines di Castro by Pietro Antonio Coppola (1842, Lisbon)

In modern times, Inês de Castro has continued to inspire operatic works, including:
Ines de Castro by Scottish composer James MacMillan. This work was first performed at the 1996 Edinburgh International Festival
 (Rage) in German by Swiss composer Andrea Lorenzo Scartazzini. The world premiere of this work was given at the Theater Erfurt, Germany, on 9 September 2006.
Ines de Castro by American composer Thomas Pasatieri. This work premiered in 1976 with the Baltimore Opera Company.
Ines by Canadian composer James Rolfe. Premiered in 2009 by the Queen of Puddings Music Theatre Company in Toronto.

In addition, Portuguese composer Pedro Camacho (born 1979) composed the Requiem to Inês de Castro, first performed on March 28, 2012 in New Cathedral of Coimbra on the occasion of 650 years of the transportation of Ines de Castro's body from Coimbra to Alcobaça Monastery.
Christopher Bochman, with the Lisbon Youth Orchestra, has produced an opera "Corpo E Alma" (Body and Soul) focusing on Pedro's transition from a sensual to a spiritual love following her death, drawing on various aspects of the tale.

Popular culture 
The 2005 TV series Pedro e Inês recounts the love story.

The 2018 film Pedro e Inês (released as The Dead Queen internationally), based on the novel by Rosa Lobato de Faria retells the story of Inês de Castro (played by Joana de Verona) and King Peter I of Portugal (Diogo Amaral). The film was met with some acclaim, winning 5 awards including Best Ensemble - National Competition at the CinEuphoria Awards 2019. Director António Ferreira received best director at Prémios Fantastic (2019) and Premios Aquila (2020).

Notes

See also

 Quinta das Lágrimas

References
 Diccionario histórico, genealógico y heráldico de las familias ilustres de la Monarquia Espanola,  Ed. Luis Vilar y Pascual, Juan José Vilar Psayla, Imprenta de D.F. Sanchez A Cargo de Augustin Espinosa, 1859.

External links

 Inês de Castro: The Queen Who Was Crowned After Death

1325 births
1355 deaths
Assassinated Portuguese people
Mistresses of Portuguese royalty
Portuguese queens consort
14th-century Portuguese people
14th-century Portuguese women
Galician nobility
Deaths by decapitation
Portuguese ladies-in-waiting
House of Castro
Posthumous recognitions